Otis Benjamin Thornton (born June 30, 1945) is a retired catcher in Major League Baseball. He played for the Houston Astros, appearing in both ends of a doubleheader played at Montreal's Jarry Park Stadium on July 6, 1973. He is one of the very few players to have played his entire ML career outside the United States.

Baseball career
Thornton was selected in the 68th round (817th overall) by the Houston Astros in the 1965 June amateur baseball draft out of Westfield High School in Docena, Alabama.

Thornton played one day of Major League Baseball. He played in both games of a doubleheader for the Astros against the Montreal Expos at Parc Jarry in Montreal, Canada on July 6, 1973. In the first game he was put in defensively as catcher in the bottom of the eighth inning for Skip Jutze. He then was pitch hit for by Rafael Batista in the ninth inning. In the second game, he came in again for Skip Jutze in the 4th inning as part of a double switch. He came to bat first in the top of the fifth inning striking out against Expos pitcher Mike Torrez. His next at-bat was in the top of the 7th inning. He stuck out again against Mike Torrez for the last out of the inning. He came to bat for his last time in the 9th inning against Mike Marshall with the bases loaded and hit a ground-out to 2nd baseman Pepe Frias who through the ball to first for the out. Bob Gallagher who was on third base scored on the play. The Astros lost both games of the doubleheader. He finished his career 0-3 with 1 RBI and a .000 batting average.

References

External links

1945 births
Living people
African-American baseball players
Major League Baseball catchers
Houston Astros players
Baseball players from Alabama
Bismarck-Mandan Pards players
Cocoa Astros players
Columbus Astros players
Denver Bears players
Florida Instructional League Astros players
Florida Rookie League Astros players
Greensboro Patriots players
Oklahoma City 89ers players
Peninsula Astros players
Raleigh-Durham Triangles players
Salisbury Astros players
Williamsport Astros players